Santi Matteo e Margherita is a Catholic parish church in the frazione of Ortignano in the town of Ortignano Raggiolo, province of Arezzo, region of Tuscany, Italy. The church is part of the Diocese of Arezzo-Cortona-Sansepolcro.

Originally solely dedicated to Santa Margherita, upon its elevation to parish in 1699, it was also dedicated to St Matthew. The interior once housed paintings from the Sienese school, including an tempera altarpiece depicting a Madonna and Child with Saints by Giacomo Pacchiarotto, now in the Museo Diocesano of Arezzo.

References

Churches in the province of Arezzo